Ibrahim Ilyas Ahmed (born 5 March 2000) is a Somali footballer who plays as a midfielder for Horseed and the Somalia national team.

Club career
In 2020, Ilyas represented the region of Banaadir at the Inter-State Football Tournament.

In 2021, Ilyas signed for Horseed, winning the Somali First Division in his first season at the club.

International career
On 23 March 2022, Ilyas made his debut for Somalia in a 3–0 loss against Eswatini in the qualification for the 2023 Africa Cup of Nations.

References

2000 births
Living people
Association football forwards
Somalian footballers
Somalia international footballers